Randolph County is a county in the northern portion of the U.S. state of Missouri. As of the 2010 census, the population was 25,414. Its county seat is Huntsville. The county was organized January 22, 1829 and named for U.S. Representative and U.S. Senator John Randolph of Roanoke, Virginia.

Randolph County comprises the Moberly, Missouri Micropolitan Statistical Area, which is also included in the Columbia-Moberly-Mexico, Missouri Combined Statistical Area.

History
Randolph County was primarily settled by migrants from the Upper Southern states, especially Kentucky and Tennessee.  They brought slaves and slaveholding traditions with them, and quickly started cultivating crops similar to those in Middle Tennessee and Kentucky: hemp and tobacco. Randolph was one of several counties settled mostly by Southerners to the north and south of the Missouri River. Given their culture and traditions, this area became known as Little Dixie, and Randolph County was at its heart.

Randolph County was home to Omar Bradley, the last of nine 5-star generals of the American military.

Geography

Adjacent counties
Macon County (north)
Monroe County (east)
Shelby County (northeast)
Audrain County (southeast)
Boone County (southeast)
Howard County (south)
Chariton County (west)

Major highways
 U.S. Route 24
 U.S. Route 63
 Route 3

Demographics

As of the census of 2000, there were 24,663 people, 9,199 households, and 6,236 families residing in the county.  The population density was 51 people per square mile (20/km2).  There were 10,740 housing units at an average density of 22 per square mile (9/km2).  The racial makeup of the county was 90.58% White, 7.03% Black or African American, 0.48% Native American, 0.39% Asian, 0.02% Pacific Islander, 0.24% from other races, and 1.26% from two or more races. Approximately 1.14% of the population were Hispanic or Latino of any race. 24.1% were of German, 21.4% American, 10.9% English and 9.1% Irish ancestry.

There were 9,199 households, out of which 31.40% had children under the age of 18 living with them, 52.70% were married couples living together, 11.10% had a female householder with no husband present, and 32.20% were non-families. 27.90% of all households were made up of individuals, and 13.10% had someone living alone who was 65 years of age or older.  The average household size was 2.43 and the average family size was 2.94.

In the county, the population was spread out, with 23.80% under the age of 18, 9.60% from 18 to 24, 29.30% from 25 to 44, 22.40% from 45 to 64, and 14.80% who were 65 years of age or older.  The median age was 37 years. For every 100 females there were 107.50 males.  For every 100 females age 18 and over, there were 108.10 males.

The median income for a household in the county was $31,464, and the median income for a family was $39,268. Males had a median income of $26,878 versus $20,366 for females. The per capita income for the county was $15,010.  About 9.20% of families and 12.50% of the population were below the poverty line, including 17.10% of those under age 18 and 13.20% of those age 65 or over.

2020 Census

Education

Public schools
Higbee R-VIII School District – Higbee
Higbee Elementary School (K-06) 
Higbee High School (07-12)
Moberly School District – Moberly 
North Park Elementary School (K-02) 
South Park Elementary School (PK-02) 
Gratz Brown Elementary School (03-05) 
Moberly Middle School (06-08)
Moberly High School (09-12)
Northeast Randolph County R-IV School District – Cairo
Northeast Randolph County Elementary School (PK-05)
Northeast Randolph County High School (06-12)
Renick R-V School District – Renick
Renick Elementary School (PK-08)
Westran R-I School District – Huntsville
Westran Elementary School (PK-05)
Westran Middle School (06-08)
Westran High School (09-12)

Private schools
St. Pius X Elementary School – Moberly (PK-08) – Roman Catholic
Maranatha Seventh-day Adventist School – Moberly (K-09) – Seventh-day Adventist

Post-secondary
Central Christian College of the Bible – Moberly– A private, four-year Christian Churches and Churches of Christ university.
Moberly Area Community College – Moberly – A public, two-year community college.

Public libraries
Little Dixie Regional Libraries

Politics

Local
The Republican Party mostly controls politics at the local level in Randolph County. Republicans hold all but three of the elected positions in the county.

State

Most of Randolph County is a part of Missouri's 6th District in the Missouri House of Representatives.   The southern portions of the county are in the 44th, 47th, and 48th Districts.
District 6 — Tim Remole (R-Excello).

District 44 — Cheri Toalson-Reisch (R-Hallsville).

District 47 — Chuck Basye (R-Rocheport).

District 48 — Dave Muntzel (R-Boonville).

All of Randolph County is a part of Missouri's 18th District in the Missouri Senate, represented by Brian Munzlinger (R-Williamstown

Federal

   
All of Randolph County is included in Missouri's 4th Congressional District and is currently represented by Vicky Hartzler (R-Harrisonville, Missouri) in the U.S. House of Representatives.

Communities

Cities
Clark
Clifton Hill
Higbee
Huntsville (county seat)
Moberly

Villages
Cairo
Jacksonville
Renick

Unincorporated communities

 Darksville
 Fort Henry
 Harkes
 Hubbard
 Kimberly
 Levick Mill
 Milton
 Mount Airy
 Randolph Springs
 Roanoke
 Ryder
 Thomas Hill
 Yates

See also
National Register of Historic Places listings in Randolph County, Missouri

References

External links
 Digitized 1930 Plat Book of Randolph County  from University of Missouri Division of Special Collections, Archives, and Rare Books

 
Little Dixie (Missouri)
1829 establishments in Missouri
Populated places established in 1829
Columbia metropolitan area (Missouri)